Ashvini (अश्विनी aśvinī) is the first nakshatra (lunar mansion) in Hindu astronomy having a spread from 0°-0'-0" to 13°-20', corresponding to the head of Aries, including the stars β and γ Arietis. The name aśvinī is used by Varahamihira (6th century). The older name of the asterism, found in the Atharvaveda (AVS 19.7; in the dual) and in Panini (4.3.36), was aśvayúj, "harnessing horses".

Astrology
The word Ashvini means horsewoman or born from a female horse. It is said to be a "Maha-nakshatra". The mother of Ashwini Kumars is Sanjana, and the father is Sun but in horse form known as Vivaswat. Ashvini is also known as the star of transport. The Chariot of Sun God is pulled by seven horses or the seven colors of the rainbow. Therefore, energy or power is associated with horses and we call it horse-power in literal terms. Ashwini thus relates to speed and agility. Ashvini is ruled by Ketu, the descending lunar node. In electional astrology, Asvini is classified as a small constellation, meaning that it is believed to be advantageous to begin works of a precise or delicate nature while the moon is in Ashvini. Asvini is ruled by the Ashvins, the heavenly twins who served as physicians to the gods. Personified, Asvini is considered to be the wife of the Asvini Kumaras. Ashvini is represented either by the head of a horse, or by honey and the bee hive.

Traditional Hindu given names are determined by which pada (quarter) of a nakshatra the Ascendant/Lagna was in at the time of birth. In the case of Ashvini, the given name would begin with the following syllables: Chu, Che, Cho, La.

See also
List of Nakshatras

References

Nakshatra Ashvini Nakshatra - vedshastra.com